John H. Hamilton may refer to:

 John H. Hamilton Jr. (1919–1986), member of the Pennsylvania House of Representatives
 J. H. Hamilton, Negro league infielder in the 1920s

See also
 John Hamilton (disambiguation)